Vana Mohini is a 1941 Indian Tamil-language film directed by Bhagwan. The film stars Srilankan actress K. Thavamani Devi and M. K. Radha. Additionally, an elephant played an important role in the film.

Plot 
The story is about a tribal girl, played by K. Thavamani Devi, who lives in a forest with an elephant. A prince (M. K. Radha) comes to the forest in search of his uncle. The prince and the tribal girl meet and ultimately fall in love. Things are going well when they are caught by the villain. In the end, the prince kills the villain with the help of the elephant (Thavamani's companion), finds his uncle and eventually marries the girl.

Cast 
 Chandru (Elephant)
 K. Thavamani as the tribal girl
 M. K. Radha as the prince
 S. S. Kokko (Real name: Pasupuleti Srinivasulu Naidu)
 Kolathu Mani
 ‘Comedian' Ambi T.V. Krishnaswami
 Kamala Bai
 K. T. Sakku Bai
 Krishna Bai
 S. Basha
 S. R. K. Iyengar
 N. Appu
 Baby Rukmini

Influences and remakes 
The film was based on a Hollywood jungle film featuring Dorothy Lamour. Thavamani also wore a revealing sarong, as Lamour had in the original film. It was the first time such an outfit was worn in a Tamil film and played a major role in the film's success. The film was also remade in Sinhala as Wana Mohini (1957) by T. R. Sundaram and A. B. Raj.

Production 
Noted Hindi film actor Bhagwan wrote the script and directed the film. Besides K. Thavamani Devi and M. K. Radha, the film featured an elephant named "Chandru", which played a major role. It was perhaps the first and only instance where an elephant received top billing in the credits of a film. The film also featured Baby Rukmini as a child artist (the mother of actress Lakshmi).

The film's music was composed by C. Ramchandra (credited as Ram Chitalkar) and includes 10 songs, many of which are sung by the female lead. Thavamani's singing talents won her the title "Singalathu Kuyil".

See also 
 List of Tamil films: 1940s
 Tamil films of 1941
 Albela

References

External links 
 

1941 films
1940s Tamil-language films
Tamil films remade in other languages
Indian black-and-white films